Alfred Thompson (1891 – 5 July 1922) was an English professional footballer who played as a forward.

References

1891 births
1922 deaths
People from Padiham
English footballers
Association football forwards
Grimsby Rovers F.C. players
Grimsby Town F.C. players
Cleethorpes Town F.C. players
Charlton's F.C. players
English Football League players